David Gelb (born October 16, 1983) is an American film director and co-founder of Supper Club, a production company.  

He is most known for his documentary work on the subject of food and cuisine, including the 2011 film Jiro Dreams of Sushi,  the Netflix series Chef's Table and Street Food, and the 2021  film Wolfgang.

Life and career
Gelb was born in Manhattan, New York City. He attended the Columbia Grammar & Preparatory School and graduated from the University of Southern California. His father is Peter Gelb, the general manager of the Metropolitan Opera; his paternal grandfather was Arthur Gelb, a former managing editor of The New York Times.  In 2016, he married Christine D'Souza Gelb, who is the principal of the A24-backed production and talent management firm, 2AM.

David Gelb released Jiro Dreams of Sushi in 2012. He created a food documentary series for Netflix called Chef's Table, which he considers a follow-up to Jiro Dreams of Sushi.

Gelb's 2015 documentary, A Faster Horse, examines the development of the 2015 Ford Mustang, a film timed to coincide with the 50th anniversary of the first Mustang.

Gelb, Brian McGinn and Jason Sterman produced Marvel's 616, a documentary series about the impact of Marvel Comics on culture.

Filmography

Awards

References

External links 
 
 

1983 births
Living people
Artists from New York City
Film directors from New York (state)
American film editors
20th-century American Jews
American people of Russian-Jewish descent
The Masters School people
Film directors from New York City
21st-century American Jews